Serdar Orçin (born 21 January 1976) is a Turkish actor. He appeared in more than thirty films since 1999.

Selected filmography

References

External links
 

1976 births
Living people
Turkish male film actors
Turkish male television actors